Blackwater Trail is a 1995 Australian TV movie directed by Ian Barry and starring Judd Nelson. It was shot in Queensland.

Cast
 Judd Nelson as Matt Curren
 Dee Smart as Cathy
 Mark Lee as Chris
 Peter Phelps as Frank
 Rowena Wallace as Beth
 Gabrielle Fitzpatrick as Sandra
 Brett Climo as Father Michael
 Daniel Roberts as Davies
 Jean-Marc Russ as Terry
 Elaine Maskiel as Nurse Sharon Jay
 Robert Young as Andy Green
 Peter Kent as Attendant
 Brendon Glanville as Waiter
 Peter Mensforth as Brian McCarthy

References

External links

Australian drama television films
1995 television films
1995 films
Australian thriller films
1995 thriller films
Australian adventure drama films
Australian action adventure films
1990s English-language films